The Fullerton Transportation Center is a passenger rail and bus station located in Fullerton, California, United States.

It is served by Amtrak's Pacific Surfliner and Southwest Chief trains, as well as Metrolink's 91 Line and Orange County Line trains. It is also a major bus depot for the Orange County Transportation Authority, and is one of the major transportation hubs of Orange County.

History
The Atchison, Topeka and Santa Fe Railway opened its first Fullerton station in 1888.

The station has two historic depots on site: one built in 1923 by the Union Pacific Railroad, and the other built in 1930 by the Atchison, Topeka and Santa Fe Railway. Both depots are on the National Register of Historic Places.

The 1930 Santa Fe depot serves as an Amtrak ticket office and passenger waiting area and has a cafe. It features Spanish Colonial Revival style architecture, as evidenced by the stuccoed walls, red tile roof, and decorative wrought ironwork.

The Union Pacific Railroad was the third railway to lay tracks through Fullerton and to build a depot.  This helped firmly establish Fullerton as the regional rail center for northern Orange County. The 1923 Mission Revival style building was designed by John and Donald Parkinson. Fullerton's redevelopment agency moved the station next to the Santa Fe depot in 1980 to preserve it. Now it is occupied by an Old Spaghetti Factory restaurant.

Pacific Electric constructed an interurban railway to Fullerton in 1917, located just north of the Santa Fe station and providing a transfer point to their system.

In September 1983, the Orange County Transit District (now the Orange County Transportation Authority) opened the Fullerton Transportation Center bus depot which is located across the street from the station which is served by OCTA routes 26, 43, 47, 143, and 543.

This station became one of the original 9 stations on the Metrolink Orange County Line when it opened on March 28, 1994 and also one of the original 7 stations when the 91 Line (now the 91/Perris Valley Line) opened on May 6, 2002.

In the late 1990s, the Fullerton Railway Plaza Association (FRPA) began fundraising and lobbying for the creation of an interactive railroad attraction or museum at the site, while continuing preservation efforts. Starting in 1999 the Amtrak station and the FRPA were hosts for the annual "Fullerton Railroad Days" event at the Santa Fe depot, an event that attracted between 30,000 and 40,000 participants.  Due to the city not supporting the FRPA museum, Railroad Days was not held in 2009, and FRPA looked elsewhere, choosing to hold its 2010 event in neighboring Brea.  The organization subsequently changed its name to the Southern California Railway Plaza Association (SCRPA). However, Railroad Days for 2020 was cancelled in response to the COVID-19 pandemic.

Service
The station is served by the Metrolink 91 Line and Orange County Line commuter rail services, plus Amtrak intercity Pacific Surfliner and long-distance Southwest Chief services however, all Southwest Chief trains going to Los Angeles stops only to discharge passengers while trains going to Chicago stops only to pick up passengers.

The BNSF San Bernardino Subdivision has three tracks through the station. Westbound passenger trains use the north track and its side platform; eastbound trains use the south track and side platform. The center track is for freight use only. An additional siding track with a side platform south of the mainline tracks is used for short turn trains that run between Fullerton and Laguna Niguel or Oceanside.

References

External links

 City of Fullerton: official  Fullerton Transportation Center  website

Buildings and structures in Fullerton, California
Amtrak stations in Orange County, California
Bus stations in Orange County, California
Metrolink stations in Orange County, California
Transportation in Fullerton, California
Former Atchison, Topeka and Santa Fe Railway stations in California
Former Union Pacific Railroad stations in California
Railway stations in the United States opened in 1888
Railway stations in the United States opened in 1923
Railway stations in the United States opened in 1930
National Register of Historic Places in Orange County, California
Railway stations on the National Register of Historic Places in California
1930s architecture in the United States
John and Donald Parkinson buildings
Mission Revival architecture in California
Spanish Colonial Revival architecture in California
1923 establishments in California
Proposed California High-Speed Rail stations
Pacific Electric stations